The Marxist–Leninist Party of Austria (MLPÖ) was founded in 1967 by members and activists of Marxists-Leninists of Austria. The central organ  ('Red Flag') was founded in 1963 by Franz Strobl the later chairman of MLPÖ.

References 

Communist parties in Austria
Defunct political parties in Austria
Defunct Maoist parties
1967 establishments in Austria
Political parties established in 1967
Political parties with year of disestablishment missing
Maoist organizations in Europe